The Manitoba Internet Exchange Inc (MBIX) is an Internet exchange point situated in Winnipeg, Manitoba, Canada. It allows traffic between members to stay within the Canadian jurisdiction, optimizing the performance and economy of traffic flows, while limiting the potential for extra-legal surveillance.

MBIX is incorporated as a Manitoban tax-exempt non-profit corporation.

Technology

 MBIX is running 4 switches.

 a Cisco Nexus 93180-EX ethernet switch, supporting speeds of 1Gbps/10Gbps on fiber
 a Cisco Nexus 93180-FX ethernet switch, supporting speeds of 1Gbps/10Gbps/25Gbps on fiber
 2x Cisco Nexus 3064-PQ ethernet switch, supporting speeds of 1Gbps/10Gbps on fiber

MBIX provides NTP and an optional BGP route reflector for multilateral peering.

Both IPv4 and IPv6 peering are possible and both are encouraged at MBIX.

Services Available

MBIX offers several services under its own ASNs.

 Route Servers: MBIX provides managed route servers giving a safe, hands-off way of establishing multilateral peering with all peers.
 NTP Services: MBIX provides public NTP services under the hostname time.mbix.ca which round robins between time{1..3}.mbix.ca

Other services present at, but not directly provided by MBIX include:

 DNS Roots: many Root, TLD and CCTLD DNS servers are available via MBIX.

Availability

 MBIX is available in four data centers in Winnipeg:

 Global Server Centre, Suite 570 – 167 Lombard Avenue
 LES.NET YWG2, Suite 201 - 294 Portage Avenue
 Manitoba Hydro Telecom Data Centre, 360 Portage Avenue
 LES.NET YWG4, Suite 825 - 355 Portage Avenue

See also 
 List of Internet exchange points

References

External links
 Official Website
 Current Peers

Internet exchange points in Canada
Network access
2011 establishments in Manitoba